The Boy Foretold by the Stars  is a 2020 Filipino coming-of-age romantic drama based on the play Ang Hangal by the film writer and director, Dolly Dulu, during his college days. It was produced by Derick Cabrido and Jodi Sta. Maria. The film revolves around the budding romance between two teenage boys in a school retreat and claims to be the first mainstream film under the "Boy's Love" (BL) genre in the Philippines.

 The Boy Foretold by the Stars  is one of the official entries for the 2020 Metro Manila Film Festival in December 2020. As part of the film festival which was modified as a digital event due to COVID-19 pandemic measures forcing the temporary closure of cinemas, It was made available for online streaming via Upstream. The film won three awards at the 2020 Metro Manila Film Festival; the 2nd Best Picture Award, the Best Original Soundtrack, and the Gender Sensitivity Award.

Synopsis 
Dominic Cruz (Adrian Lindayag) is an openly gay high school student from St. Francis Catholic School, an exclusive school for boys. He goes to Quiapo with one of his best friends, Timmy (John Leinard Ramos), to consult Baby R (Iyah Mina), a popular fortune teller renowned for her 99.5 percent accurate predictions regarding love life. During this visit, Baby R informs Dominic that he will meet his soul mate within a week, and gives him three signs to help him determine the identity of his match. Meanwhile, Luke Armada (Keann Johnson), a member of St. Francis' basketball team, has just broken up with his girlfriend Karen (Rissey Reyes) and decides to participate in the "Journey of the Lord" retreat in an attempt to move on. Dominic, who was coincidentally one of the volunteers for the retreat, was assigned as Luke's sponsor and they quickly become good friends. Baby R's three signs then become apparent and point to Luke being Dominic's match.

Cast

Lead Cast
 Adrian Lindayag as Dominic Cruz
 Keann Johnson as Luke Armada
 Rissey Reyes as Karen

Supporting Cast

Release 
 The Boy Foretold by the Stars  is one of the official entries for the 2020 Metro Manila Film Festival. It was released online via Upstream due to the COVID-19 pandemic measures in the Philippines.

Reception 
The Boy Foretold received 12 award nomination for the 2020 Metro Manila Film Festival awards and won for Best OST, Gender Sensitivity Award, and 2nd Best Picture.

Sequel 
It was announced on February 2, 2021, that Dreamscape Entertainment, one of the divisions of ABS-CBN Corporation, will co-produce a limited television series along with Clever Minds Inc. that would serve as the sequel to the movie. The series is titled "Love Beneath The Stars". Most of the cast members of the film have returned to reprise their roles.

References

External links 
 
 

2020 films
2020 romantic drama films
2020 LGBT-related films
Gay-related films
Philippine teen LGBT-related films
Films not released in theaters due to the COVID-19 pandemic
Philippine coming-of-age films
Philippine LGBT-related films